Coleophora tauricella is a moth of the family Coleophoridae. It is found in Croatia and Greece.

The larvae feed on Echium species.

References

tauricella
Moths of Europe
Moths described in 1880